'Vous les femmes may refer to:

Vous les femmes (TV series), French series (English title WOMEN!)
"Vous les femmes" (song), commonly known title of the Julio Iglesias song "Pauvres Diables"